Leipzig Industriegelände West was a former railway station located in Leipzig, Germany. The station was located on the Leipzig–Probstzella railway. The station closed in December 2012, as part of the renovation and upgrade of the line for the S-Bahn Mitteldeutschland, which opened in December 2013.

References

Industriegelande West
Railway stations closed in 2012